is a Japanese actor. His career spans more than 30 years. Among his movies are Bee Bop High School (1985), Bee Bop highschool; Koko yotaro elegy (1986), Bee Bop highschool; Koko yotaro march (1987), and Street Fighter II: The Animated Movie (1994).

Selected filmography
Bee Bop High School – 1985
Bee Bop highschool; Koko yotaro elegy – 1986
Bee Bop highschool; Koko yotaro march – 1987
Street Fighter II: The Animated Movie – 1994

External links

Japanese male film actors
1964 births
Living people